The Bobrinski Bucket, also called a kettle or cauldron, is a 12th-century bronze bucket originally manufactured for a merchant in Herat in 1163 out of bronze with copper and silver inlaid decorations.  It provides one of the earliest examples of Persian anthropomorphic calligraphy. It is named after a former owner, Count Bobrinsky, and is now in the Hermitage Museum in Saint Petersburg.

Inscription and Decoration 
The decoration of the bucket is done with copper and silver inlay. In this process patterns are created by embedding a different material onto the surface of the object. The bucket features alternating bands of calligraphy and pictorial scenes. The inscriptions, written in Arabic, are of general well wishes. In the pictorial scenes there is no visual hierarchy. The figures within each band are of the same size and detail. The first register is an inscription in anthropomorphic Naskh script with the tops of the letters having a human form. The second register shows pictorial scenes of entertainment, followed by a band of inscription in interlaced Kufic script. Following that are depictions of men on horseback, playing polo and hunting. In the next band of inscription animals are interwoven in the calligraphy "as if these letters were trees in a wood". The last band shows hares, antelopes and dogs running in file.

See also
 Situla (vessel)

External links
 Epigraphy, from Iranicaonline.org
 Studies in Islamic Metal Work--V by D. S. Rice, on JSTOR
 BBC News In pictures: Art from Islamic Lands (4th picture)

References 

Archaeological collections of the Hermitage Museum

Bronzeware
Islamic metal art
Persian art